Armando Contreras Castillo (born 13 April 1968) is a Mexican politician affiliated with the National Regeneration Movement serving as a federal deputy from Oaxaca and the third electoral region. From 2010 to 2012, he was a senator in the LXI Legislature of the Mexican Congress representing Oaxaca, having been an unused alternate between 2006 and 2010 for Salomón Jara Cruz and being sworn in to replace Cruz when he left for the Oaxaca state government.

References

1968 births
Living people
Politicians from Oaxaca
Members of the Senate of the Republic (Mexico)
Party of the Democratic Revolution politicians
21st-century Mexican politicians
Morena (political party) politicians
Municipal presidents in Oaxaca
Benito Juárez Autonomous University of Oaxaca alumni